The Virginia Slims of Jacksonville (its sponsorship name) or Jacksonville Invitation its official name is a defunct WTA Tour affiliated women's tennis tournament played from 1972 to 1973. It was held in Jacksonville, Florida in the United States and played on outdoor clay courts.

History
In 1961 the Jacksonville Invitation was established as a men's tournament played on outdoor hard courts. That tournament became known as the Jacksonville Open. This tournament was established in 1972 as the Jacksonville Invitation for women an outdoor clay court event. Virginia Slims of Jacksonville was the sponsorship name of this tournament.

Past finals

Singles

Doubles

References

External links
WTA Results Archive

Clay court tennis tournaments
Virginia Slims tennis tournaments
Defunct tennis tournaments in the United States
1972 establishments in Florida
1973 disestablishments in Florida
Recurring sporting events established in 1972
Recurring sporting events disestablished in 1973
Women's sports in Florida